Tank Battle is a Milton Bradley board game of strategy where players attempt to out-guess and out-maneuver their opponent in a contest of armored warfare, and includes the extra strategy brought by fuel and ammunition dumps as well as anti-tank guns and mines. The playing pieces are modeled after actual World War II tanks of the Americans and Germans, these being the M4A3 Sherman Medium Tank and the Panzerkampfwagen V Panther Ausf. G.

Milton Bradley touted this game as "The game of planning and strategy".

Game play 
The players take turns moving tanks across a 10x10 grid of 100 numbered rectangles, while attempting to take out the ammunition dump, the fuel depot, the headquarters, the anti-tank guns and the tanks of the opposing player.  The player that destroys all the opponent's tanks without losing all of theirs wins.

References

External links 
 Tank Battle at Board Game Geek

Board games introduced in 1975
Milton Bradley Company games